The International ZO Women's Tournament is an annual bonspiel, or curling tournament, that takes place in late November in Wetzikon, Switzerland. The tournament is held in a triple knockout format. The tournament is part of the World Curling Tour. It is traditionally held a week before the European Curling Championships.

Past champions
Only skip's name is displayed.

References

External links
Event Home Page

 
Champions Curling Tour events